Jeļena Ostapenko and Alicja Rosolska were the defending champions, but Ostapenko chose not to participate this year. Rosolska played alongside Lara Arruabarrena, but lost in the first round to Alla Kudryavtseva and Katarina Srebotnik.

First-time pairings Timea Bacsinszky and Vera Zvonareva won the title, defeating Kudryavtseva and Srebotnik in the final, 2–6, 6–1, [10–3].

Seeds

Draw

Draw

References
Main Draw

St. Petersburg Ladies' Trophy - Doubles
St. Petersburg Ladies' Trophy